"I Like" (stylised as "i Like") is a song by American singer Jeremih and is produced by Mick Schultz. The song features rapper Ludacris. It is the lead single from his second album All About You. The song was released to iTunes on July 6, 2010, by Def Jam.

Music video
The music video for the song was directed Ray Kay and was shot on location on a boat. It features Ludacris and a host of beautiful women and was released on September 1, 2010, on iTunes by Def Jam.

Charts

Weekly charts

Year-end charts

Certifications

Release history

References

2010 singles
Jeremih songs
Ludacris songs
Music videos directed by Ray Kay
Songs written by Ludacris
Songs written by Jeremih
2010 songs
Songs written by Mick Schultz
Def Jam Recordings singles